The Central New York Classic was a golf tournament on the Ben Hogan Tour. It was only played in 1990. It was played at Seven Oaks Golf Course in Hamilton, New York.

In 1990 the winner earned $20,000.

Winners

Former Korn Ferry Tour events
Golf in New York (state)
Central New York